The Soviet Union's 1972 nuclear test series was a group of 24 nuclear tests conducted in 1972. These tests  followed the 1971 Soviet nuclear tests series and preceded the 1973 Soviet nuclear tests series.

References

1972
1972 in the Soviet Union
1972 in military history
Explosions in 1972